Bokengehalas Creek is a stream in the U.S. state of Ohio. It is tributary of the Great Miami River.

Bokengehalas Creek was named for a Delaware Indian chief who settled near its banks.

Location

Mouth: Confluence with the Great Miami River at De Graff 
Origin: Logan County northeast of Bellefontaine

See also
List of rivers of Ohio

References

Rivers of Logan County, Ohio
Rivers of Ohio